The Islamic Community Center of Anchorage Alaska (ICCAA) is an Islamic center and mosque in Anchorage, Alaska. According to its site, the congregation includes Muslims from Europe, Asia, and Africa, as well as converted native Alaskans.

The organization is constructing Alaska's first mosque, which will be the third northernmost mosque in North America. It is located at Spring Street and E. 80th Avenue in Anchorage, Alaska.

Ground was broken in October 2010 for the construction of the mosque, school, and Islamic center.

See also
History of Islam in the Arctic Circle
  List of mosques in the United States

References

External links

Buildings and structures in Anchorage, Alaska
Culture of Anchorage, Alaska
Mosques in Alaska
Organizations based in Anchorage, Alaska
2014 establishments in Alaska
Islamic organizations established in 2014